The International Marblehead is a class of radio controlled sailing yacht used for competitive racing. It is a measurement controlled class administered by the International Radio Sailing Association. 

As a designated International IRSA class it is entitled to hold World Championships officially recognised by the International Sailing Federation. A Marblehead has a maximum length of 1290 mm and a maximum draught of ca 700 mm, but no minimum displacement. Up to six rigs are allowed, the tallest being about 2200 mm.

Events

World Championships

References

External links
  International Radio Sailing Association Website
 ISAF Marblehead Microsite Website

Classes of the International Radio Sailing Association
Keelboats
Development sailing classes